Rap Album One is a studio album by American hip hop artist Jonwayne. It was released on October 29, 2013 on Stones Throw Records. Music videos were created for "The Come Up" and "How to Be a Gemini."

Critical reception 

At Metacritic, which assigns a weighted average score out of 100 to reviews from mainstream critics, the album received an average score of 74, based on 8 reviews, indicating "generally favorable reviews".

Del F. Cowie of Exclaim! gave the album a 7 out of 10, commenting that "Jonwayne's flow is verbose, cerebral and free-associative by nature; toss in the gruff delivery, and the MF Doom comparisons are inevitable." Kyle Kramer of Pitchfork gave the album a 6.0 out of 10, saying, "His sound is minimal, in many cases relying on just piano and subdued drum pattern—live he uses just a sampler and a mic—which works to vivid effect."

Laurent Fintoni of Fact praised the album as "the sound of an artist who's finally found some balance between his rapper and producer halves." In January 2014, it was named the Worldwide Winner of Album of the Year by British radio and club DJ Gilles Peterson. Max Bell of LA Weekly also called it "one of the best rap albums of the year".

Track listing

Personnel 
Credits adapted from the album's liner notes.

 Jonwayne – vocals, production , recording
 D-Styles – turntables 
 Scoop DeVille – additional vocals , production 
 Zeroh – additional vocals , additional keyboards 
 Mndsgn – additional keyboards 
 Daddy Kev – mixing, mastering
 Jeff Jank – design
 Theo Jemison – photography

References

External links 
 

2013 albums
Jonwayne albums
Stones Throw Records albums
Albums produced by Scoop DeVille